Shackleton's Antarctic Adventure is an IMAX film about the Imperial Trans-Antarctic Expedition led by Ernest Shackleton between 1914 and 1917. Directed by George Butler, the film was released in February 2001 and was narrated by Kevin Spacey. It documents Shackleton's journey aboard the Endurance and was the follow-up to Butler's previous film, The Endurance: Shackleton's Legendary Antarctic Expedition.

Plot
In 1914, Shackleton set out to walk across the whole of Antarctica. While the South Pole had already been discovered, people had yet to make the cross-continent trek on foot. Before making landfall, however, his ship became trapped in the ice-flow of the Weddell Sea where he and his crew stayed for over 400 days.

Cast
 Kevin Spacey - Narrator (voice)
 Michael Gambon - Sir Ernest Shackleton (voice)
 Conrad Anker - Himself
 Reinhold Messner - Himself
 Stephen Venables - Himself

Production
The film was shot on location in Antarctica and also utilizes footage taken by the original expedition photographer, Frank Hurley.

Critical reception
 The film received "Two Thumbs Up" from Ebert and Roeper.
 Rotten Tomatoes suggests it is "a gorgeously made film tracking the explorer's legendary 1914 expedition to the icey, uninhabited continent."
 Joe Leydon, in Variety, wrote, "Despite its brevity, 'Adventure' vividly conveys the character and courage of Shackleton, one of the last great champions of the Heroic Age of Adventure. Butler glosses over a few unpleasant details in this telling of the story—for the sake of school-aged sensibilities, he was requested to refrain from showing how crewmen were forced to kill sled dogs for food—but the story remains gripping nonetheless."

References

External links
 The film's official page
 White Mountain Films
 

2001 films
Documentary films about Antarctica
Ernest Shackleton
IMAX short films
2001 short documentary films
IMAX documentary films
Films directed by George Butler (filmmaker)
Films scored by Sam Cardon
2000s English-language films
2000s American films
American short documentary films